Wentworth Falls is a three-tiered waterfall fed by the Jamison Creek, near the town of Wentworth Falls in the Blue Mountains region of New South Wales, Australia. The falls are accessible via the National Pass Walking Trail and the Overcliff/Undercliff Walk.

Features and description
Near the falls, there is a rocky knoll that has a large number of grinding grooves created by rubbing stone implements on the rock to shape and sharpen them. These marks have been determined to be signs of early human habitation nearby. 

In February 2013, following a period of high rainfall, the Wentworth Falls was reported as looking "spectacular" with torrents of water flowing.

Accidents
The waterfall has been the site of fatal accidents for two English tourists: 27-year-old Paul Marshall from Leicester, who fell 76 metres (250 ft) off the waterfall and died while paddling in a rock pool in December 2000, and 20-year-old Josh Furber from Runcorn, who slipped on rocks and died after falling 100 metres (330 ft) off the waterfall in January 2013. It is also notable for being the death site of The Whitlams original bassist Stevie Plunder, who allegedly committed suicide there in 1996.

Access
A picnic area, accessible via a sealed road from the Great Western Highway, is located a short distance from the town of Wentworth Falls, with parking for cars and larger vehicles. 

A view of the top of the falls is easily accessible from the Wentworth Falls Lookout which is accessed by a slightly sloping concrete path (wheelchair accessible) from the car park area. Stop first at the Jamison Lookout for views over the Jamison Valley.

There are two access points which lead down well-formed steps to Princes Lookout from where you can see most of the first two sections of the falls before they disappear into the valley below. A good way to do this walk to Princes Lookout is to walk out to the Wentworth Falls Lookout and then take the steps leading down to the falls, about an eight-minute walk. When returning take the left fork when you come to the meeting of two stairways, this will bring you back to the main pathway at the top near the Jamison Lookout.

Other easy and challenging walking trails loop from the picnic area and follow the Jamison Creek south to the top of Wentworth Falls where scenic views over the expansive Jamison Valley to the south can be enjoyed. A trail follows the creek as it cascades down several waterfalls; with a further trail leading down into the valley floor.

Arriving by train
Accessed via the Blue Mountains Line from the Wentworth Falls railway station, the easiest way to reach the Blue Mountains National Park is to walk the Charles Darwin Walk. This walk follows Jamison Creek along a track that provides access to waterfalls and birdwatching. The walk is  one way (45 minutes to one hour and 15 minutes) and starts from Wilson Park (10 minutes from the railway station).

Gallery

See also

List of waterfalls of Australia

References

External links 
 

 

Wentworth Falls
Wentworth Falls, New South Wales
Tiered waterfalls

zh:溫特沃斯瀑布